Moby Dick Records was a small disco record label founded by Boys Town Gang producers Bill Motley (DJ Bill Motley) and Victor Swedosh in 1980. Its headquarters were located at 573 Castro Street, San Francisco, California, United States. Swedosh also owned the Moby Dick Bar (opened in 1977) located in the Castro district.

The label was known for "The Moby Dick Sound" and contributing to "Frisco Disco". Its famous acts included Boys Town Gang, Yvonne Elliman and Patrick Cowley. Moby Dick also distributed C & M Records, as well as associating with the late night partiers from the Trocadero Transfer, a popular disco nightclub at the time.

Moby Dick Records closed in 1984, after seven of its ten core employees died of AIDS.

References

External links
Website
Discomusic

Record labels based in California
Defunct record labels of the United States
Defunct companies based in the San Francisco Bay Area